The 1985 Big League World Series took place from August 10–17 in Fort Lauderdale, Florida, United States. Host team Broward County defeated Carolina, Puerto Rico twice in the championship game.

Teams

Results

References

Big League World Series
Big League World Series